Eramet Titanium & Iron is a pig iron and titanium dioxide clinker plant in Tyssedal, Norway.

It was established as Ilmenittsmelteverket on 21 December 1983 as a replacement after Det Norske Nitridaktieselskap closed its aluminum plant in Tyssedal. Production commenced in 1986. In 1988 it was bought by Tinfos Jernverk and renamed Tinfos Titan & Iron. In 2008 Tinfos was bought by Eramet, giving the plant its current name.

14.05.2020: Bought by TRONOX

References

Companies established in 1983
1983 establishments in Norway
Manufacturing companies of Norway
Companies based in Hordaland
Odda
Metal companies of Norway